This is the discography of American blues musician Robert Cray.

Albums

Studio albums

Collaborative albums

Extended plays

Singles

References

Blues discographies